Mauricio Ezequiel Quiroga (13 March 1992 – 20 June 2022) was an Argentine racing cyclist.

Biography
In 2010, Quiroga joined the World Cycling Centre, where he met cyclists such as Ran Margaliot and Daniel Teklehaimanot. In 2012, he became a professional cyclist, joining the Argentine team San Luis Somos Todos.

Major results
2010
 2nd  Keirin, UCI Junior Track World Championships
2014
 National Track Championships
1st  Scratch
1st  Kilometer
2016
 1st Stage 4 
2017
 1st 
 1st 
2018
 2nd Overall Giro del Sol San Juan
1st Stage 1 
 1st Stage 5 Doble Bragado
2022
 2nd Overall Vuelta del Porvenir San Luis
1st Stages 1 & 5
 10th Overall Vuelta a Formosa Internacional
1st Stage 3

References

External links

1992 births
2022 deaths
2022 suicides
Argentine male cyclists
People from San Luis, Argentina
Suicides in Argentina